Kyaa Dil Ne Kahaa is a 2002 Indian Hindi romantic comedy-drama film directed by Sanjay Chhel. The film was a remake of the Telugu film Swayamvaram.

Cast
 Tusshar Kapoor as Rahul Vashisht
 Esha Deol as Esha Kapoor
 Rajesh Khanna as Siddharth (Rahul's father) 
 Smita Jaykar as Maya Vashisht (Rahul's mother)
 Raj Babbar as Esha's father
 Neena Kulkarni as Esha's mother
 Shammi as Esha's grandmother
 Ashok Saraf as Mr. Rajeev Patel
 Razak Khan as Chander
 Osho Chhel as Young Rahul
 Dilip Joshi as Dost

Plot
New Zealand-settled Esha (Esha Deol) is attracted to fellow-student Rahul (Tushar Kapoor). Rahul too is attracted to Esha. Esha returns home to India and tells her parents (Raj Babbar, Neena Kulkarni) about her love for Rahul. The family is pleased and proceeds to finalize the marriage. They accompany Esha to Rahul's house. Rahul's parents (Rajesh Khanna, Smita Jaykar) approve of Esha. But when they ask Rahul, to everyone's shock, he refuses to marry Esha under any circumstances.

Soundtrack

Music by Himesh Reshammiya. Lyrics by Sanjay Chhel. According to the Indian trade website Box Office India, with around 10,00,000 units sold, this film's soundtrack album was the year's thirteenth highest-selling. The song "Nikamma Kya Is Dil Ne" was later re-composed for the film Nikamma by Javed-Mohsin. Abhimanyu Dassani, Shirley Setia, and Shilpa Shetty danced to the song.

References

External links
 

2002 films
Indian romantic comedy-drama films
2002 romantic comedy-drama films
2000s Hindi-language films
Films scored by Himesh Reshammiya
Hindi remakes of Telugu films
2002 comedy-drama films